Kevin Mattison (born September 20, 1985) is an American former professional baseball outfielder. He played in Major League Baseball (MLB) for the Miami Marlins. Mattison attended the University of North Carolina at Asheville, where he played college baseball for the UNC Asheville Bulldogs baseball team.

Kevin Mattison tied an all time Pacific Coast League record on June 1, 2013 by striking out six times in a single Triple A Game.

Florida/Miami Marlins

Mattison was drafted by the Marlins in the 28th round (838th overall) of the 2008 MLB Draft. The Marlins assigned Mattison to the Arizona Fall League after the 2011 regular season, where he won the Dernell Stenson Sportsmanship Award. He was added to the Marlins' 40 man roster after the 2011 season to protect him from the Rule 5 draft.

On May 11, 2012, Mattison was recalled to Miami after hitting .250 with 3 HR and 13 RBI in 31 games with Triple-A New Orleans. Mattison played in 1 game and getting 1 at-bat, a pinch-hit groundout. On May 15, Mattison was optioned back to New Orleans. On May 24, Mattison was recalled to Miami after Austin Kearns was placed on the 15-day DL. He finished the season with the New Orleanes Zephyrs. He batted .241, with 23 doubles, 6 triples, 13 homers, 41 RBIs, 44 walks, 145 strikeouts in 482 at-bats He also stole 26 bases while being caught 12 times. He played in 121 games with a .310 OBP, a .394 SLG, and a .704 OPS.

Milwaukee Brewers

On December 12, 2013, Mattison was selected by the Milwaukee Brewers in the minor league phase of the Rule 5 Draft. He was released by the Brewers on August 21, 2014.

Washington Nationals
Mattison signed a minor league contract with the Washington Nationals in January 2015. He was released on May 8, 2015.

See also

Rule 5 draft results

References

External links

1985 births
Living people
Baseball players from Fort Lauderdale, Florida
Miami Marlins players
UNC Asheville Bulldogs baseball players
Jamestown Jammers players
Greensboro Grasshoppers players
Jupiter Hammerheads players
Jacksonville Suns players
New Orleans Zephyrs players
Surprise Saguaros players
Nashville Sounds players
Syracuse Chiefs players